Tahish al-Huban is a Yemeni short story collection by Zayd Mutee' Dammaj. It was first published in 1973.

References

Books by Zayd Mutee' Dammaj
1973 books